Havu (or Haavu or Kihavu) is a Bantu language of the Democratic Republic of the Congo. It is spoken mainly in the Idjwi and Kalehe territories of Sud-Kivu Province, in the east of the DRC.  It is closely related to the Shi language.

The Havu language is also spoken in the city of Goma, north of the island. However, ethnic Havu in Goma are not using the language as much as those on the island of Idjwi.

References

Ethnic groups in the Democratic Republic of the Congo
Languages of the Democratic Republic of the Congo
Great Lakes Bantu languages